Malapandaram (Hill Pandaram) is a Dravidian language of Kerala and Tamil Nadu that is closely related to Malayalam.

References

Malayalam language